Lebanon competed at the 1992 Summer Olympics in Barcelona, Spain. Twelve competitors, all men, took part in 15 events in 7 sports.

Competitors
The following is the list of number of competitors in the Games.

Athletics

Cycling

Two cyclists represented Lebanon in 1992.

Men's road race
 Vatche Zadourian
 Armen Arslanian

Fencing

Two fencers represented Lebanon in 1992.

Men's foil
 Zahi El-Khoury
 Michel Youssef

Men's épée
 Zahi El-Khoury
 Michel Youssef

Judo

Rowing

Swimming

Weightlifting

References

External links
Official Olympic Reports

Nations at the 1992 Summer Olympics
1992
1992 in Lebanese sport